Big Mac: The Mad Maintenance Man (shown on the box cover as More Adventures of Big Mac: The Mad Maintenance Man and often abbreviated Big Mac) is a video game published in 1985 by Mastertronic for the Commodore 64. It is a platform game in the style of Manic Miner.

The player takes on the role of the title character who must negotiate a power station consisting of 18 separate levels (vaults).  On each level the aim is to avoid a range of defences and press switches to shut down the vault.

Reception
The game received a 79% rating from Zzap!64.  They found the graphics somewhat basic, though nicely animated.  The music was complimented and overall the game was considered to be good value for money.

Legacy
The game was hacked by Gábor Herczeg and re-released as a freeware "sequel" under the name Big Mac II. This game was in fact the same as the original but with extra levels.

References

External links

Commodore Plus/4 World's page on Big Mac, containing screenshots and scans
A fan page of the game with screenshots and scans

1985 video games
Commodore 64 games
Commodore_16_and_Plus/4_games
Mastertronic games
Platform games
Video games developed in the United Kingdom